The Shaanxi University of Technology (SUT) is a post-secondary educational institution in Hanzhong, Shaanxi, China.

History
It was established in June 2001 when the Shaanxi Institute of Technology and the Hanzhong Teacher's College merged with the approval of the Ministry of Education.

References

External links
 Shaanxi University of Technology 
Shaanxi University of Technology  

 
2001 establishments in China
Educational institutions established in 2001
Universities and colleges in Shaanxi
Technical universities and colleges in China